Nawab Malik (Marathi:नवाब मलीक), is a politician, who served as the Minority Development, Aukaf, Skill Development and Entrepreneurship Minister of Maharashtra and also the guardian minister of Gondia & Parbhani. He is the National Spokesperson and Mumbai President of the Nationalist Congress Party.

Personal life 
Nawab Malik was born in Dhuswa village of Utraula Tehsil, Balrampur district in eastern Uttar Pradesh, in 1959. In 1970, he migrated with his family to Mumbai for better prospects. Malik's father was into the business of rags (chindi) for which he set up a business in Dongri and later moved to Kurla in Mumbai. Here Malik started a scrap business. Later he moved on to social work eventually entering politics. Malik is married to Mehjabin and has four children with her - Faraz (son), Nilofer (daughter), Sana Malik Shaikh (daughter), and Aamir (son).

Politics 
He then joined social work with the Sanjay Vichar Manch and worked closely with Maneka Gandhi after the death of Sanjay Gandhi. In 1984, he contested his first election and got just 2500 votes. Later he joined Congress before moving to Samajwadi Party where he won a by-poll and was given post of minister in Congress NCP alliance government in 1999. However soon after, he moved to the NCP due to his differences with Abu Azmi. The NCP gave him post of MoS and later a cabinet minister post and is a former housing minister of Maharashtra. He was elected to the Maharashtra Vidhan Sabha in 1996, 1999, 2004 from Nehru Nagar (Vidhan Sabha constituency) and in 2009 from Anushakti Nagar (Vidhan Sabha constituency) in Mumbai. He is currently the Mumbai president of the Nationalist Congress Party.

Controversies

Nawab Malik was engaged in controversy about a then senior Narcotics Control Bureau (NCB) officer, Sameer Wankhede at personal level. Nawab Malik made comments about Wankhede and his family and warned Wankhede of losing his job. Later, Malik tendered an 'unconditional apology' to Bombay High Court for public remarks he made despite his earlier undertaking not to post anything about NCB Zonal Director Sameer Wankhede and his family.

Malik was arrested by the Enforcement Directorate on 23 February 2022 in a money laundering case and his alleged links with underworld don Dawood Ibrahim. He was charged and placed under arrest under the provisions of Prevention of Money Laundering Act (PMLA) after several hours of grilling. One of the charges the ED is investigating against Malik — initially leveled by former Maharashtra Chief Minister Devendra Fadnavis — is a property deal that Malik had entered into. There are allegations that the property was allegedly bought by Malik from an aide of Dawood Ibrahim at a price lower than its prevailing market rate. A prime property of 2.80 acre on L B S Marg in Kurla was bought by Solidus Investment Private Limited for a meagre ₹30 lakh. The signatory on the deal was Faraz Malik, the son of Nawab Malik. He has been remanded to ED custody until the 3rd of March 2022.

Member of Legislative Assembly
Anushakti Nagar Assembly Constituency

References

Nationalist Congress Party politicians from Maharashtra
Living people
Maharashtra MLAs 1999–2004
1959 births
Prisoners and detainees of India
People from Balrampur district